The 48th Yasar Dogu Tournament 2020, was a wrestling event held in Istanbul, Turkey between 10 and 12 January 2020.

The international tournament included competition in both men's and women's freestyle wrestling. The tournament was held in honor of the two time Olympic Champion, Yaşar Doğu.

Medal table

Team ranking

Medal overview

Men's freestyle

Women's freestyle

Participating nations
216 competitors from 19 nations participated.

 (26)
 (17)
 (1)
 (16)
 (3) 
 (5) 
 (1)
 (2) 
 (3) 
 (3)
 (1)
 (7)
 (3) 
 (9)
 (10)
 (2)
 (94)
 (5)
 (8)

See also
2020 Grand Prix Zagreb Open

References 

Yasar Dogu
2020 in sport wrestling
January 2020 sports events in Turkey
Sports competitions in Istanbul
Yaşar Doğu Tournament
International wrestling competitions hosted by Turkey